Šank Rock or Shank Rock, is a five-piece Slovenian rock group from Velenje, formed in 1982. Their first album Pridite na žur was released in 1987. The band was on hiatus from 1999 to 2002. In 2006 the band separated with their guitarist Bor Zuljan and replaced him with Rok Petkovič, with whom they made their 14th album Senca sebe which received a lot of success. In January 2011, the bassist Cvetko Polak and the singer Matjaž Jelen left the group because of disagreements. The group disbanded after that. The group reassembled in 2014 with a different line-up.

Their greatest distinction is probably that their music remains the same as it was from the beginning. They have not succumbed to modern music influences and that is what makes them unique phenomena on Slovenian hard rock scene.

Current members 
 Matjaž Jelen - vocals (1982 - 1998, 2002 - 2010, 2014 -)
 Bor Zuljan - guitars (1990 - 1998, 2002 - 2006, 2014 -)
 Cveto Polak - bass (1982 - 1994, 2002- 2010, 2014 -)
 Samo Jezovšek - keyboards (2018 -)
 Roman Ratej - drums (2014 -)

Former members 
 Aleš Uranjek - drums (1982 - 1997, 2002 - 2010)
 Davor Klarič - keyboards (1982 - 2010)
 Roki Petkovič - guitars (2005 - 2010)
 Peter Slanič - keyboards (? - 1988)
 Miro Mramor - guitars (? - 1988)
 Zvone Hranjec - guitars (1982 - 1990)
 Inko Brus - bass (1994 - 1998)
 Silvano Leban - drums (1997 - 1998)

Discography 
 Pridite na žur, 1987
 Dobro in zlo, 1988
 Jaz nimam noč za spanje, 1990
 Šank rock IV, 1991
 Moj nočni blues, 1992
 V živo na mrtvo, 1993 (live)
 Crime time, 1995
 Bosa dama, 1996 (unplugged)
 Poglej v svet, 1996
 Šank rock X, 1998
 Od šanka do rocka, 2002
 Vzemi ali pusti, 2003
 Na mrtvo v živo, 2004 (live)
 Senca sebe, 2007
 25 let - Velenje, 2008 (live)
 Restart, 2015
 Nekaj več, 2017

Greatest hits 
 Puščava sna
 Pridite na žur
 Hitro drugam
 Metulj
 Dobro in zlo
 Jaz nimam noč za spanje
 Rockerji
 Verjemi mi
 Le 17
 Laški pir
 Maček
 Pravljica o mavričnih ljudeh
 Jaz in Ti
 Ker te ljubim
 Tih' bod' in igraj!
 Želim, da si tu
 Vzemi ali pusti
 Hvala za vse
 TV
 Delam, kar paše mi
 Dej bolj na glas radio ( feat. 6 Pack Čukur)
 Hočeš, nočeš (feat. Natalija Verboten)
 Nekaj pod kožo
 Senca sebe
 D'j se mal' nasmej

External links 
 Official page

Slovenian rock music groups
Slovenian hard rock musical groups
Glam metal musical groups
Yugoslav hard rock musical groups
Yugoslav glam metal musical groups
Musical groups established in 1982
1982 establishments in Yugoslavia